The following lists events that happened during 1842 in New Zealand.

Population
The estimated population of New Zealand at the end of 1842 is 76,900 Māori and 10,992 non-Māori (a 120% increase in 1 year).

Incumbents

Regal and viceregal
Head of State – Queen Victoria
Governor – Captain William Hobson dies on 10 September. His replacement Captain Robert Fitzroy does not arrive until 26 December 1843.

Government and law
Chief Justice – William Martin

Main centre leaders
Mayor of Wellington – George Hunter is elected Mayor on 3 October, the first Mayor in New Zealand. (see also 1843)

Events 
 1 January: The Government begins publication of a monthly magazine in Māori, Te Karere o Nui Tireni (The Messenger of New Zealand). It publishes until 1846, and is revived as The Maori Messenger and Te Manuhiri Tuarangi between 1849 and 1863.
 1 February: The first settlers arrive in Nelson aboard the Fifeshire.
 24 February: The Bay of Islands Observer begins publishing. The newspaper publishes its last issue on 27 October 1842.
 12 March: The Nelson Examiner and New Zealand Chronicle is first published. It continues until 1874.
 6 April: The New Zealand Herald and Auckland Gazette, which was founded in 1841, ceases publication.
 April: The Auckland Standard begins publication. It folds on 28 August, after four months.
 May : Wellington becomes a Borough.
2 August: The New Zealand Colonist and Port Nicholson Advertiser begins publishing. It lasts for one year.
 29 August: The Auckland Times begins publication. It runs until 1846.

Undated 
 Copper is discovered on Kawau Island and a mine established.

Sport

Cricket
The first recorded game in Wellington is played in December.

Horse racing
 20 October – Races are held on the beach at Petone.

Births
 7 August: (in the Hutt Valley) Edward Riddiford, runholder
 25 November: William Downie Stewart, politician
 (unknown date): Charles Rous-Marten, journalist and railway writer (in England)

Deaths
 7 March: Wiremu Kingi Maketu, first person executed in New Zealand under British rule
 5 June: Charles Armitage Brown, pioneer New Plymouth businessman
 10 September: William Hobson, first Governor of New Zealand
 22 November: Te Kakapi-o-te-rangi Te Wharepouri, tribal leader

Unknown date
Te Purewa, tribal leader

See also
List of years in New Zealand
Timeline of New Zealand history
History of New Zealand
Military history of New Zealand
Timeline of the New Zealand environment
Timeline of New Zealand's links with Antarctica

References

External links